Skelsmergh is a small village and former civil parish, now in the parish of Skelsmergh and Scalthwaiterigg, in South Lakeland in rural Cumbria, England, about  north of Kendal, on the A6 road.

St. John the Baptist Church at Skelsmergh dates from about 1871 and was built by Joseph Bintley, a Westmorland architect. Skelsmergh Hall incorporates a pele tower, probably built in 1425, with late 16th century and early 17th century additions. The tower is now an outbuilding. The River Sprint runs alongside the village and is "one of the quietest of the Lake District's valleys".Skelsmergh had a population of 303 according to the 2011 census. When comparing this to the total population of the village 50 years earlier, in 1961, it is clear that the population has seen an increase from 250 in 1961.

An entry by John Bartholomew states that
"Skelsmergh, township, in par. and 2 miles NE. of Kendal, Westmorland, 2093 ac., pop. 367."

From 1866 Skelsmergh was a civil parish in its own right until it was abolished on 1 April 2015 and merged with Scalthwaiterigg to form "Skelsmergh and Scalthwaiterigg".

Skelsmergh had a population of 303 according to the 2011 census. It previously had a joint parish council with the adjacent parish of Scalthwaiterigg.

Parish Church
"Skelsmergh church parish was created in the 19th century with the aim to serve the townships of Skelsmergh, Scalthwaiterigg and Patton...The entrance to the churchyard is a monument to those who died from the parish during the First World War". "The three light East window is of the Crucifixion, designed and executed by Heaton, Butler and Bayne". Situated in the nave are two stained glass windows. "The cemetery has been extended to a field across the road to accommodate more burials".

"Regular worship in the church is led by the Beacon Team Ministry...Members of the congregation take on the duties of reading, preparing the intercessions and chalice administration...Two members of the congregation take part in the provision of hospital communion, organised by the Beacon Team, at the Westmorland General Hospital". The majority of the residents that attend the services are regular and committed to attending, with primary elderly people attending. As expected, Festivals attract more people, with key annual events such as Easter and Christmas Eve 'Carols and Candlelight' hosting larger than normal crowds. Many of the congregation come from outside and beyond the parish but have strong links with the village of Skelsmergh.

When looking back over previous records it is thought that there has been a church on or near this site for many centuries, mentioning a small chapel in the region roughly around the mid to late 1600s."The antiquarian the Rev Thomas Machell mentions a ruined chapel in his report on the area in 1692...From the early 17th century the ruined chapel had not been suitable for locals to worship in due its poor state of repair". During this poor state of the chapel, those wanting to worship had to travel three or four miles to Kendal to worship at the Parish church of Holy Trinity. In 1870 A local group, the Skelsmergh Chapelry Committee, was set up to promote the building of the church and to raise enough money to build their church.

"The foundation stone was laid by The Venerable J Cooper on the 5th of May, 1870 only a few months after the committee had set out its plans… The church was complete by 1870, and finally consecrated on the 2nd of November by the Bishop of Carlisle… With the consecration of the church, the new chapelry of Skelsmergh, Scalthwaiterigg and Patton was created, with an estimated congregation of around two hundred worshipers".

Population

Between 1881 and 1961 the population of Skelsmergh saw an overall decrease. In 1881 the total population was 367 which showed an increase of 17 from 10 years before. However, in the following 20 years the population began to decrease, going down to 336 in 1891, then further decreasing to 303 in 1901. After rising up again to 329 in 1921, the population began to decrease again with the count being 250 in 1961. When we compare this figure with the most recent Census data report for Skelsmergh in 2011, we can see that the population has seen an overall increase from 50 years previous, as the total population was recorded at 303.

When we break down the total population in to males and females, when assessing the 1881 and 1891 count, males were the dominant gender in terms of the number of males in Skelsmergh compared to females. In 1881 there were 197 males in comparison to 170 females, and although both these figures dropped in the following census report in 1891, there were still more males (171) than females (165) occupying the village. For the next three census reports the dominant gender changed with the total female population being larger than the total male population in the 1911, 1921 and 1931 report. Between 1931 and 1961 the total male and female population that made up the overall Skelsmergh total population was very even which can be represented by the figures from the 1961 census report where the total male and female count were both 125.

The 2011 Census data report shows that it is the males in Skelsmergh that have a higher population compared with the female population. Of the total population of 303, 161 were males and 142 were females. Although the male population just about has a higher total than the female population in the village itself, it is evident that for the South Lakeland region it is the females that dominate the males with a total of 50,522 males to 53,136 females.

Jobs

The occupations of the Skelsmergh population vary, with job descriptions varying from managerial and director roles to caring, leisure and other service occupations. According to the 2011 census, of the villages' residents aged 16 to 74, 161 of these were in employment. This figure of 161 contributes to the employment count of 3,228,744 amongst the North West population.

The 2011 Census shows that 11.2% of the working population are labelled as either 'Managers, Directors or senior officials'. The highest percentage of the total job count, at 21.7%, appears to be those people said to have 'Professional Occupations'. Of the listed jobs, 'caring, leisure and other service occupations' had the lowest count with just four people, or 2.5%.

When we compare the occupations of the residents in recent years and 1881 (in the bar chart on the left) we can analyse how the jobs have varied over time. As we can see it is evident that the male population were in work more compared with the women and this agrees with the ideology at this time where men were seen as the providers with the women at home caring for the children. It is clear that the most occupied job of all of those shown in the chart were those jobs associated with agriculture. Those villagers involved with the agricultural industry were all men at the time the data was recorded in 1881, with over 50 male residents with jobs involved in agriculture. When looking at the most occupied job for the females it is apparent that domestic related jobs were the most occupied by the female population. Although the majority of female workers were involved with jobs linked with domestic roles, the total number of workers was lower compared to the most occupied male job in 1881, reinforcing the idea that men were in work more than the women. However, the chart does show that the title of many of the female workers jobs in the village were unknown with no specific job title.

Education

There were 14 full-time students in Skelsmergh between the ages of 16 to 74 according to the 2011 Census data and this figure contributes to the 465, 955 full-time students between these ages across the North West region. Of the 14 full-time students, there are 9 that are economically active in employment, 2 that are economically active but unemployed and 3 that are completely economically inactive according to the 2011 Census data. When you compare the data of Skelsmergh with the surrounding South Lakeland region it is clear that the majority of full-time students aged 16 to 74 in the South Lakeland region are economically inactive. However, the data shows that for Skelsmergh 64% of the full-time students are economically active in employment which goes against the overall region trend.

Housing

The total number of houses in Skelsmergh has seen a change since 1881 when we compare data from this time to the most recent recorded census data in 2011. The lowest housing count between these time periods was in 1901 where there was a total housing count of 63 which was 6 less than 10 years before. When assessing the census data on the total number of houses it is clear that there is an overall increase between 1881 and 2011. The most recent count shows a total number of households at a figure of 136. This figure makes up just a small percentage of the number of houses occupying the South Lakeland region, with the figure recording 46, 552 houses.
The 2011 Census data shows that of the 136 houses, 125 were classified as a whole house or bungalow. If we wish to break down the housing type in more depth, this figure of 125 can be sub divided into detached (58), semi-detached (41) and terraced (26) housing, which added together give us this figure.

Religion and ethnicity

Of the 303 total population the dominant religion is clearly Christian with 178 people confessing to Christianity as their religion, as evident in the 2011 Census data. This figure of 178 is just a very small percentage of the total number of people across the South Lakeland region that are Christian followers. Of the data recorded to discover information about religious beliefs in Skelsmergh, 86 people admitted to have no religion with an additional 36 residents not stating their religion. Of the remaining population 'Jewish' (2) and 'Buddhist' (1) were the only additional religions followed in the village.

When examining the variety in Ethnic groups in Skelsmergh using the 2011 Census data, the residents only range over three of the different Ethnic group classifications. 284 of the residents are in the group classified as 'White; English/Welsh/Scottish/Northern Irish/British', 15 in 'White; Other White' and 4 in 'White; Irish'.

See also

 Listed buildings in Skelsmergh

References

External links
 Cumbria County History Trust: Skelsmergh (nb: provisional research only – see Talk page)
 Skelsmergh & Scalthwaiterigg Parish Council
 Skelsmergh Community Hall

Former civil parishes in Cumbria
Villages in Cumbria
South Lakeland District